Sherman's Way is a 2008 American independent comedy-drama film starring James LeGros, Enrico Colantoni, Lacey Chabert, Donna Murphy, Brooke Nevin, and Michael Shulman.  The film was directed by Craig Saavedra, written by Thomas R. Nance, and produced by Starry Night Entertainment. Sherman's Way completed principal photography in 2007 and was shot in Manhattan, Los Angeles, Clear Lake, California.

Plot

The life of Yale Law School student Sherman takes an unexpected turn when he decides to follow his girlfriend's advice and take more chances in life. She meant their relationship. But Sherman's new spontaneity lands him in the car seat next to Palmer, a washed-up, cheerfully eccentric former Olympic athlete.

Dumped and cut off from his mother's funds, Sherman has to travel with Palmer to Southern California for an important job opportunity.

Cast
 James LeGros as Palmer
 Enrico Colantoni as D.J. 
 Michael Shulman as Sherman Black
 Brooke Nevin as Addy
 Donna Murphy as Evelyn Black
 Thomas Ian Nicholas as Tom
 Lacey Chabert as Marcy

Reference list

External links
 
Official Film Website

2008 films
2008 comedy films
2008 drama films
2008 comedy-drama films
2008 independent films
2000s English-language films
American comedy-drama films
American independent films
Films scored by David Michael Frank
Films shot in Los Angeles
Films shot in New York City
2000s American films